Union for Peru was a Peruvian political party founded by Javier Pérez de Cuéllar, an ex-UN Secretary General, in 1994 to run for the Presidency of Peru in the 1995 general elections. Originally a social democratic party, the party became the main political home of the Peruvian ethnocacerist movement in the late-2010s after a group led by former Army Major Antauro Humala joined the party. Humala later formed the Patriotic Front in 2018 and contested the 2021 general elections.

History 
Union for Peru was founded in 1994 by the former Secretary General of the United Nations, the diplomat Javier Pérez de Cuéllar together with Daniel Estrada Pérez and José Vega Antonio, to participate in the elections generals of 1995, against the-then dictator Alberto Fujimori, who was running for reelection.

At the elections held on 9 April 2000, the party nominated former Fujimorist first vice president Máximo San Román as its presidential candidate, but he performed poorly in the elections placing last with 0.3% of the popular vote but in the legislative elections, the party won 2.6% of the popular vote and only 3 out of 120 seats in the Congress of the Republic, a decrease of 14. During this parliamentary period, UPP made an alliance with the Popular Action bench in the legislature and both showed their opposition to the dictatorship of Alberto Fujimori.

Shortly after Alberto Fujimori won the 2000 elections amid accusations of electoral fraud, he decided to resign after the "Vladivideos" scandal and call general elections for 2001.

At the legislative elections held on 8 April 2001, the party won 4.1% of the popular vote and 6 out of 120 seats in the Congress of the Republic. However, they did not present a presidential candidate for that year's elections.

In the 2006 elections, Union for Peru aligned itself with the Peruvian Nationalist Party and endorsed Ollanta Humala, who faced Alan García in the presidential runoff election. In the congressional election, the alliance won with 21.2% of popular vote, and 45 out of 120 seats in the Congress. However, after the elections, the alliance split and the Nationalist sat on their own bench with Union for Peru sitting in their own bench too.

In the 2011 elections, the party joined forces with the National Solidarity Party to form the National Solidarity Alliance to support the presidential candidacy of former Lima Mayor Luis Castañeda Lossio. The alliance placed fifth at both the presidential and parliamentary election, attaining 9 out of 130 seats, with Vicente Zeballos and Martin Belaunde Moreya as the only two elected congressman from Union for Peru. The party would retain its alliance with the National Solidarity Party for the 2016 elections as well, jointly nominating Hernando Guerra García but the ticket withdrew due to its low support at national polls and fears of losing its status as a political party. In the 2020 snap parliamentary elections, the party won 6.8% of the vote and 13 seats out of 130 seats in the Congress after almost four years of absence in Congress. In the 2021 elections, the party nominated the party Secretary-General José Vega for the Presidency, but, he was disqualified on 29 December 2020, because of incomplete information regarding income on the nominees registration form, but he was reinstated on 6 February 2021. On the Election Day, Vega places 14th with 0.7% of the vote, while in the Congressional election, the party lost all of its 13 seats and only won 2.1% of the vote and the party is expected to lose its party registration.

The party's Secretary-General as of 2021 was José Vega Antonio.

Electoral history

Presidential elections

Elections to the Congress of the Republic

References

Political parties established in 1994
Political parties disestablished in 2021
1994 establishments in Peru
2021 disestablishments in Peru
Third Position
Nationalist parties in South America
Populist parties
Syncretic political movements